Madrazo is a Spanish surname and sometimes uses as "Maderazo" in the Philippines and US :

 Ángel Madrazo, Spanish road cyclist
 Carlos Madrazo, Mexican politician
 Roberto Madrazo, Mexican politician affiliated with the Institutional Revolutionary Party (PRI), son of Carlos Madrazo
 José de Madrazo y Agudo, Spanish painter
 Luis de Madrazo y Kuntz (1825–1897)  painter, son of José de Madrazo y Agudo
 Pedro de Madrazo y Kuntz (1816-1898), art critic, son of José de Madrazo y Agudo
 Juan de Madrazo y Kuntz (1829-1880), architect, son of José de Madrazo y Agudo
 Federico de Madrazo y Kuntz (1815-1894), Spanish painter, son of José Madrazo y Agudo* 
 Raimundo de Madrazo y Garreta, Spanish realist painter, son of Federico de Madrazo y Kuntz
 Ricardo de Madrazo, Spanish Orientalist painter, son of Federico de Madrazo y Kuntz
 Cecilia de Madrazo, daughter of Federico de Madrazo y Kuntz, married Spanish artist, Mariano Fortuny
 Federico de Madrazo y Ochoa (1875-1934), son of Raimundo de Madrazo and grandson of Federico de Madrazo y Kuntz
 Pablo Sierra Madrazo, Spanish footballer
 Sergio Canales Madrazo, Spanish footballer
  Carlos “Carling “ Mortola Madrazo- chemical engineer; national Philippine Sugar Industry's pioneer. Recognised by the industry and the Philippine Government.
  Rodolfo “Rody” Mortola Madrazo- agriculturist; an expert in rubber, coconut and orchard farming in the Philippines. Also a presidential awardee on his merits and efforts.
  Marco Antonio Madrazo-  Talent Development professional working consulting with Fortune 100 companies in the United States.
 Reverend Father Rogelio “Roger” Pilar Madrazo, A Bahamian Parish Priest who made his marks in community and pastoral works thereat.

 Dr.Carlos “Calitoy” Laspiñas Madrazo-  known graduate Professor of business and Rural Development at a known Philippine university in Mabinay, Negros. Also noted for his works in faith-based NGOs in the Philippine, Nepal, Bangladesh and Timor Leste. He taught in universities in Indonesia, China, East Timor also. He was a published author, well- rounded and an avid Boy Scout (US & the Philippines)

Meaning

"Madrazo" comes from the Valles Pasiegos in Cantabria and Espinosa de los Monteros in Burgos, northern Spain. The origin of the name is unknown but in Spanish and Portuguese it is understood to refer the process by which the second wife of widower man takes care of the children of the deceased first wife.

People with Madrazo surname

In Spain, the name Madrazo is strongly associated with an important dynasty of artists. Members of the Madrazo family literally dominated 19th-century painting in Spain.  Don Jose de Madrazo y Agudo was a noted painter and teacher who became the Director of the Prado Museum in 1838. His sons were Federico de Madrazo y Kuntz (1815-1894), a painter; Luis de Madrazo y Kuntz (1838 -1894), a painter; Pedro de Madrazo y Kuntz (1816-1898), an art critic and Juan de Madrazo y Kuntz, an architect; while his grandsons were Raimundo de Madrazo y Garreta (1841-1920), a painter and Ricardo de Madrazo y Garreta (1852-17), also a painter. His grand-daughter, Cecilia de Madrazo y Garreta married the celebrated Orientalist artist, Mariano Fortuny (1838-1874). 

.  The Madrazo Family of German & Carmen Madrazo of 242-A (garcia)German Madrazo Drive, Don L.E. Alfaro Street, Tetuan, Zamboanga City, has retained the original Spanish spelling of the surname. Philippines Yahoo's Facebook list over 500 people with Madrazo surnames living in this country. The early spread of the surname followed the expansion of Spanish colonization. Most of the people with Madrazo surname in the Philippines have mixed Chinese and Malay blood stocks unlike most of the other Madrazos living in South America. However, Madrazos who hailed from the original Zamboanga City lineage include the three brave Madrazo brothers Carlos, Sr., Lulo and Isabelo (all sons of German and Carmen) who founded/settled in San Carlos City, Negro Oriental sometime before Liberation. The original Zamboanga City descendants went on to have remarkable careers in education (Rosa Garcia & Florinda Bello; agriculture (Rodolfo Sr.); the government services, in general (Amando Sr, Cecilia) and private enterprise (Gerardo Sr). Their descendants have been living in all parts of the world as the UK, Italy, France, Germany, Denmark, Norway, Sweden, Italy, the Middle East, SE Asian countries as well as the United States, Canada and South America. A Catholic priest, Rev. Fr. Roger Madrazo was a parish priest in the Bahamas (death 2019).  The noted businessman and civic leader Edmundo N. Madrazo of Davao City also came from the other branch of the Clan. Intermarriages between and among prominent families of the city and beyond include the Natividads, Sebastians, Montehermosos, Garcias, Bellos, Bucoys, Matiases
and Pilars 

A Facebook Family page (German & Carmen Inc., founded 2010) has been a close linkage that establishes the Madrazo family of Tetuan, Zamboanga City of the Philippines to the modern world.

The blood line has started from the original LIM KUY, a full-blooded Chinese who migrated to the Philippines via Taiwan and then making his way to Manila. Trying his luck there together with relatives and fellow immigrants and making daily ends meet, he eventually started working in Manila as a handyman in a Chinese textile factory in Binondo, and after saving some money, he was able to look for greener pastures going South. It was via the old Spanish Cavite Naval yard in Ternate that he was introduced to a job opportunity in Cebu. However, it was not to be as swindlers just wanted their money after filling up quite a number of papers that were bogus. Lim Kuy and some workers were not defeatists and decided to proceed to Zamboanga town anyway.
The Spanish Orden to hispanise all Filipino surnames in the middle of the 19th century, was what initiated the Madrazo surname from that time on. And so MADRAZO  became a fixture in the Philippine community life as we know it then and now.(source: El Shelico)LibradeApellidos/Historian del maga Madrazo de Tetuan di German y Carmen)

References

Spanish-language surnames